Meşedibi is a village in the Ardahan District, Ardahan Province, Turkey. Its population is 509 (2021). In 2008 it passed from the Göle District to the Ardahan District.

References

Villages in Ardahan District